Pentalinon is a genus of flowering plants in the family Apocynaceae, first described as a genus in 1845. It is native to the West Indies, Central America, Mexico, and Florida.

Species
 Pentalinon andrieuxii (Müll.Arg.) B.F.Hansen & Wunderlin - Hidalgo, Tabasco, Yucatán Peninsula, Oaxaca, Chiapas, Belize, Guatemala, El Salvador, Honduras, Nicaragua  
 Pentalinon luteum (L.) B.F.Hansen & Wunderlin - Bahamas, Cayman Islands, Turks & Caicos Islands, Cuba, Hispaniola, Puerto Rico, Lesser Antilles, Jamaica, islands of western Caribbean, S Florida

References

 
Apocynaceae genera